"Election Day" is the 19th episode of the third season of the American sitcom Modern Family, and the series' 67th episode overall. This episode originally aired on ABC on April 11, 2012. It was written by Ben Karlin, and directed by Bryan Cranston.

Plot
The day of the council elections, for which Claire (Julie Bowen) is running, has come and everyone in the family is assigned a task to help her get as many votes as possible.

Cameron (Eric Stonestreet) and Mitchell (Jesse Tyler Ferguson) campaign for Claire in a truck with a loud speaker from which they urge people to vote for Claire. They do really well till the moment Cameron sees someone tossing a tissue on the street instead of the garbage can that is right next to them. Cameron gets upset and shouts to the man via the speaker to pick it up. When the man does it, they realize the power of the microphone and they begin using it for reasons unrelated to Claire's campaign.

When they see a friend named Sandy (Melinda Page Hamilton) on the street, they start commenting on her fiancé and saying that he is gay. The only problem is that the microphone is on and Sandy, along with everyone else on the street, hears the “private” conversation. Now they have to convince Sandy that her fiancé is not gay.

Phil's (Ty Burrell) task is to drive 50 senior citizens to the polls to vote for Claire but he only manages to transport one, their neighbor and Luke's (Nolan Gould) best friend Walt (Philip Baker Hall). Walt first remembers that he needs his glasses to be able to vote and then his oxygen tank needs to be changed. Phil is willing to take him back home to change it, but Walt does not have a second one at home so they need to go and buy one. Later, Walt needs food to take his pills and he will not vote until he eats and has his pills. The result is that the polls close and Phil gets only one extra vote for Claire instead of fifty.

Meanwhile, Alex (Ariel Winter) is in charge of the phone banks and she supervises everyone so they do their part right but no one seems to do it right. Luke promises that if they vote for Claire they will not have to pay taxes again and Alex tries to explain to him that he can not say that. Gloria (Sofía Vergara) finds it difficult to convince people to vote for Claire via the phone when in person is much easier and Alex explains to her that that's exactly the reason; in person they can actually see her. Manny (Rico Rodriguez) is the only one who manages to get some people to vote for Claire while Haley (Sarah Hyland) is worried about other things since she has been rejected from all five colleges she applied to and she did not tell anyone. There is only one left for which she is afraid to open the letter.

Jay (Ed O'Neill) does not really have a task, he just needs to vote. While going to the polls with Gloria and Manny, he sees that a woman he slept with is working the polls and he runs away. He later explains to Gloria why he left. Dottie (Stephanie Faracy) is the first woman he dated after his divorce and the way he ended it was not the best. He returns to the polls and tries to vote while Dottie is not there but he runs into her the moment he has to put his ballot in the box. Dottie takes the ballot and she refuses to put it in the box. As a result, Jay does not even vote for his daughter.

In the meantime, Claire is being interviewed at the polls by a local newspaper reporter who does not even recognize her as the candidate. Before the reporter takes a picture of her, Alex notices a tag sticking out of Claire's suit. Claire bites it off but she loses her fake front tooth (due to an old ice-skating accident). The reporter takes the picture with Claire missing her tooth but that is not the only problem since without the tooth Claire sounds drunk when she talks something that also does not help with the radio interview she has later on.

The night, despite the catastrophic day, everyone is gathered at the Dunphy house for the election results party while waiting for the outcome. Claire takes a moment to thank everyone for their help and what they did during the day to get her more votes since she does not know that they did not really help much. While speaking, she gets a phone call where they inform her that she lost the election. Everyone hugs her and Phil changes the “Congratulations Claire” sign to “Condolences Claire”.

Claire goes to the kitchen to get a glass of wine and Haley follows her to tell her about the college letters and that she has only one last chance left. Haley is afraid to open it and Claire reassures her that no matter what the letter says they will still love her and she can always try the next year. The entire family is also there, they hear the conversation and they totally agree with Claire. Haley opens the letter and she finds out that she made the waiting list. Everyone is happy with that since it is better than nothing.

At the end of the episode, despite her loss, we see that Claire finally gets the STOP sign she asked for (and was the reason she decided to run for town council after the councilman himself rejected her proposal). However, a car then drives past it without stopping, so she decides that the road needs speed bumps.

Reception

Ratings
In its original American broadcast, "Election Day" was watched by 10.35 million; down by 0.25 million from previous episode. The adult 18-49 rating/share was 4.2/11.

Reviews

The episode received positive reviews.

Donna Bowman of The A.V. Club gave and A− rate to the episode saying that it was one of the best episodes of the season. "Election Day sounds like just the thing to bring our Modern Family gang back from their hiatus, and back together for a classic-style ensemble episode. I’m happy to report that this promising premise isn’t wasted by the creative team and by guest director Bryan Cranston."

Leigh Raines of TV Fanatic rated the episode with 4.5/5, praising on Cameron, Mitchell, Gloria and Claire's troubling moments that made the episode "hilarious".

Christine N. Ziemba of Paste Magazine rated the episode with 8.9/10. "The show was really Claire Dunphy’s moment in the spotlight, and director Bryan Cranston—yes, that Bryan Cranston of Breaking Bad fame—allowed Julie Bowen to showcase her physical comedy prowess and Claire’s Type-A, ultra-competitive nature at her best (and worst)."

Michael Adams of 411mania rated the episode with 9/10 saying that it was great and praised Philip Baker Hall's character, Walt, who "stole" the episode. "Call him Walt, call him Mr.Kleezak, but this week, call him Character of the Week! In an episode where everyone had their moments and lots of funny stuff was happening, he was hands down the funniest part of the episode. His whole final segment about lamb and Obama was fantastic!"

Wyner C of Two Cents TV gave a good review to the episode saying that he loved it. "I LOVED this episode. Every one of their neuroses came out full force and they reconvened at the end of the episode. The best scenes are when they’re together."

References

External links 
 
 "Election Day" at ABC.com

2012 American television episodes
Modern Family (season 3) episodes